
The Morceaux de salon (French for Salon Pieces; , Salonnyye Pyesy), Op. 10, are a set of pieces for solo piano composed by Russian composer Sergei Rachmaninoff in 1894.

Individual pieces 
 Nocturne in A minor (Ноктюрн, Noctyurn)
 Waltz in A major (Вальс, Vals)
 Barcarolle in G minor (Баркарола, Barkarola)
 Mélodie in E minor (Мелодия, Melodiya)
 Humoresque in G major (Юмореска, Yumoreska)
 Romance in F minor (Романс, Romans)
 Mazurka in D major (Мазурка, Mazurka)

See also 
 Morceaux de salon, Op. 6, a set of two pieces for piano and violin

Sources

Citations

Sources

Further reading

External links 

1894 compositions
Piano music by Sergei Rachmaninoff
Compositions for solo piano
Suites (music)
Articles containing video clips